Kadhi bari or bari kadhi is a South Asian vegetarian curry, made up of gram flour, dahi and spices. This vegetarian dish is popular in Uttarkhand, Bihar, Jharkhand and Uttar Pradesh states of India as well as in Bagmati, Lumbini, Madhesh and No.1 provinces of Nepal.  

The bari is made from paste of besan in a dumplings, which is later deep fried in cooking oil and Kadhi is made from mixing dahi, gram flour and spices. This dish is generally eaten in summer and festivals like Holi, Jur Sheetal and Krishna Janmashtami. It is usually served with steamed rice, but it can also be served with roti and puri.

References

Bihari cuisine
Vegetarian dishes of India
South Asian cuisine
Nepalese cuisine